State Route 233 (SR 233) is a state highway in the U.S. state of California. It serves as an alternate route between State Route 152 and State Route 99 in Madera County, running along Robertson Boulevard through the center of Chowchilla instead of bypassing the city. Drivers going from eastbound SR 152 to northbound SR 99 must use SR 233 since there is no such direct ramp at the 99/152 interchange.

Route description
SR 233 begins at an interchange with SR 152 in Madera County. Past the western terminus, the road continues as Robertson Boulevard. The road heads northeast through farmland and desert along with some development on two-lane undivided Robertson Boulevard, entering the city of Chowchilla. In Chowchilla, SR 233 widens to four lanes and passes through residential and commercial areas of the town. The route becomes a divided highway and crosses a Union Pacific railroad line before coming to its eastern terminus at an interchange with SR 99 just northeast of town. The road continues east as Avenue 26 towards Hensley Lake past the interchange.

SR 233 is part of the National Highway System, a network of highways that are considered essential to the country's economy, defense, and mobility by the Federal Highway Administration.

Major intersections

See also

References

External links

California @ AARoads.com - State Route 233
Caltrans: Route 233 highway conditions
California Highways: SR 233

233
State Route 233
Chowchilla, California